Theodore Roosevelt Park may refer to:

 Montauk County Park (formerly known as Theodore Roosevelt County Park)
 Theodore Roosevelt Island Park, Washington DC
 Theodore Roosevelt Memorial Park, Oyster Bay, New York
 Theodore Roosevelt Monument, New Jersey
 Theodore Roosevelt National Park, North Dakota
 Theodore Roosevelt Wilderness
 Theodore Roosevelt National Wildlife Refuge Complex, Mississippi
 Theodore Roosevelt National Wildlife Refuge
 Theodore Roosevelt Park, Manhattan, New York City
 Theodore Roosevelt State Park, Pennsylvania

See also
 Roosevelt Park (disambiguation)
 Theodore Roosevelt (disambiguation)